The Cathay Shi-Wei Financial Center is a 27-story,  skyscraper office building completed in 2001 in Lingya District, Kaohsiung, Taiwan. The plan of Cathay Shi-Wei Financial Center is a horizontal T shape, forming a square and rectangular structure respectively. The space connected by the two areas serves as the building's elevator equipment, stairs, and logistics equipment. The building is covered with pink tiles and reinforced glued heat-insulating glass. Located in close proximity to the Kaohsiung City Government, the building houses the Kaohsiung branch of Mitsubishi Electric.

See also 
 List of tallest buildings in Taiwan
 List of tallest buildings in Kaohsiung

References

2001 establishments in Taiwan
Buildings and structures in Kaohsiung
Skyscraper office buildings in Kaohsiung
Office buildings completed in 2001